Sir Benjamin James Chapman, 4th Baronet (9 February 1810 – 3 November 1888) was an Anglo-Irish Whig politician and barrister.

Chapman was the son of Sir Thomas Chapman, 2nd Baronet and Margaret Anne Fetherstonhaugh, and the brother of Sir Montagu Chapman, 3rd Baronet. He was educated at Trinity College Dublin, graduating with a Bachelor of Arts in 1830 and becoming a practicing barrister. In 1849, he married his cousin, Maria Fetherstonhaugh, daughter of Richard Steele Fetherstonhaugh and Dorothea née George. They had three children: Dora Marguerite Chapman, Sir Montagu Richard Chapman, 5th Baronet (1853–1907), and Sir Benjamin Rupert Chapman, 6th Baronet (1865–1914).

He succeeded to the Baronetcy of Killua Castle in 1853 upon the death of his brother, Montagu Chapman. Upon his own death in 1888, the title was inherited by his son, Montagu Richard Chapman.

He was also a member of the Reform Club, and High Sheriff of Westmeath in 1856, and Custos Rotulorum of Westmeath and Lord Lieutenant of Westmeath from 1883 and 1888.

References

External links
 

1810 births
1888 deaths
19th-century Anglo-Irish people
UK MPs 1841–1847
Whig (British political party) MPs for Irish constituencies
Baronets in the Baronetage of Ireland
Alumni of Trinity College Dublin
High Sheriffs of County Westmeath
Lord-Lieutenants of Westmeath
Chapman baronets